High Street is the main shopping and business street in towns in the United Kingdom, Australia, and elsewhere.

High Street may also refer to:

Streets 
 High Street, Bristol, England
 High Street, Cambridge or Trinity Street, Cambridge, England
 St Mary Street/High Street, Cardiff, Wales
 High Street (Columbus, Ohio), United States
 High Street (Doncaster), England
 High Street, Dublin, Ireland
 High Street, Edinburgh, part of the Royal Mile
 High Street, Fremantle, Western Australia
 High Street, Glasgow, Scotland
 High Street, Hong Kong
 High Street, Lincoln, England
 High Street, Newport, Wales
 High Street, Oxford, England
 High Street, Sheffield, England
 High Street, Swansea, Wales
 High Street, Worthing, England

Other uses 
 High Street (film), 1976 Belgian film
 High Street (Lake District), fell in the Lake District, England
 High Street, Oxford (painting), 1810 oil painting by J. M. W. Turner
 High Street, Cornwall, a hamlet in England, UK
 High Street Phoenix, shopping mall in Mumbai, India
 High Street Records, an American record label
 High Street School, Dunedin, former school in Dunedin, New Zealand

See also
 High Street Historic District (disambiguation)
 High Street station (disambiguation)
 High Road (disambiguation)
 High (disambiguation)
 Market Street (Philadelphia), formerly named High Street